Ñumí Mixtec is a diverse Mixtec language of Oaxaca. It may be closest to Peñasco Mixtec.

Dialects
Egland & Bartholomew found four dialects which have ca. 80% mutual intelligibility with each other, spoken in the following towns:

(San Juan) Ñumí, (Santiago) Nunduchi, (San Sebastián) Nicananduta
(San Antonio) Monteverde
(Santo Tomás) Ocotepec
(San Bartolomé) Yucuañe

Yucuañe is no longer being passed on to children.

References 

Mixtec language